Naulakha Bazaar (Punjabi) is bazaar located in Lahore, Punjab, Pakistan.

History
The bazaar was established in 1633 and is located in Lahore Fort near Naulakha Pavilion. The Shaheed Ganj Mosque is located in Naulakha Bazaar. The used clothing and crockery bazaar, landa bazaar, is also located near Naulakha Bazaar.

When the Naulakha Pavilion was built in 1633 by the Mughal emperor Shah Jahan as a small summer house, it cost around 900,000 rupees, an exorbitant amount at the time. It is called Naulakha because in Punjabi language, the word means 'worth 9 lakhs rupees'. This also brought the word Naulakha into common use to signify something precious.

See also 
 Badshahi Mosque
 Bazaar
 History of marketing
 Lahore Fort
 Market (place)
 Naulakha Pavilion
 Retail
 Shalimar Gardens
 Shaheed Ganj Mosque
 Walled City of Lahore

References

External links 
 Mosque and gurdwara face off at Naulakha

Lahore Fort
1631 establishments in India
Walled City of Lahore
Buildings and structures completed in 1633
Lahore
Bazaars in Lahore
Market towns in Pakistan
Tourist attractions in Lahore
Shopping districts and streets in Pakistan